Pascal-Firmin Ndimira (born 9 April 1956) was Prime Minister of Burundi from 31 July 1996 until 12 June 1998, when the post was abolished.

Ndimira, an ethnic Hutu from Ngozi province, is a member of the Union for National Progress (UPRONA) party. He was born in Muyinga.

References

1956 births
Living people
People from Ngozi Province
Hutu people
Union for National Progress politicians